Pierre Alexandre Claudius Balmain (18 May 1914 – 29 June 1982) was a French fashion designer and founder of leading post-war fashion house Balmain. Known for sophistication and elegance, he described the art of dressmaking as "the architecture of movement."

Early life
Balmain's father, who died when the future designer was seven, owned a wholesale drapery business. His mother, Françoise, ran a fashion boutique called Galeries Parisiennes with her sisters. He went to school at Chambéry and, during weekends with his uncle in the spa town of Aix-les-Bains, his interest in couture fashion was inspired by society women he met.

Balmain began studying architecture at the École des Beaux-Arts in 1933, also undertaking freelance work drawing for the designer Robert Piguet.

Career
After visiting the studio of Edward Molyneux in 1934, he was offered a job, leaving his studies and working for the designer for the succeeding five years. He joined Lucien Lelong during World War II – where he met the young designer Christian Dior.

Death
Pierre Balmain died at the age of 68 of liver cancer at the American Hospital of Paris, having just completed the sketches for his fall collection.

Fashion house of Balmain

The fashion house of Balmain opened in 1945. Initially, it showcased long bell-shaped skirts with small waists – a post-war style that was popularised in 1947 as Dior's New Look. The first collection was showcased in Vogue in the November issue and the reviewer's reaction was that Balmain delivered "beautiful clothes that you really want to wear." A positive write-up in the magazine from Balmain's friend Gertrude Stein helped to seal the designer's success – early celebrity fans included the Duchess of Windsor who ordered from the collection.

Balmain actively promoted himself internationally from the early days – touring Australia in 1947 and designing a line to be produced in the country. He expanded operations to the United States in 1951, selling ready-to-wear clothes that earned him a prestigious Neiman Marcus Fashion Award in 1955. He was, by this stage, designing clothes worn by Vojislav Stanimirovic and stars, such as Marlene Dietrich and Katharine Hepburn.

Such was Balmain's reputation that he was chosen to design the wardrobe of Queen Sirikit of Thailand during her 1960 tour of the United States. In 1968, he created outfits for the 1968 Winter Olympics in Grenoble. He also designed outfits for both TWA and Malaysia–Singapore Airlines' (later Singapore Airlines) cabin crew in the 1960s and '70s. Air France's first female pilot in 1975 wore a uniform by Balmain

After he dressed Nicaraguan first lady Hope Portocarrero, she appeared on the 1968 International Best Dressed List Hall of Fame.

Erik Mortensen, a student of the Danish designer Holger Blum, began as a design assistant at Balmain in 1948. He and Balmain worked well together, and Mortensen quickly went from assistant to collaborator. He and Balmain worked together for the rest of Balmain's life. Margit Brandt worked as a young designer with Pierre Balmain in the early 1960s. Balmain also spotted the talent of Karl Lagerfeld, hiring him in 1954 after judging a fashion competition that the young German designer won.

Balmain's vintage couture gowns remain popular, and have been worn by Angelina Jolie, Penélope Cruz, Alexandra Kerry, Tatiana Sorokko, Kate Moss, Kristin Davis and Zendaya.

Costume design
Balmain was nominated for the Tony Award for Best Costume Design and won the Drama Desk Award for Outstanding Costume Design for Happy New Year (1980). Additional Broadway theatre credits include costumes for Sophia Loren in The Millionairess (1960) and Josephine Baker for her eponymous 1964 revue. He also was a costume designer for 16 films, including the Brigitte Bardot vehicle And God Created Woman and La Parisienne, and designed on-screen wardrobes for the actresses Vivien Leigh and Mae West. He made a lot of dresses for Dalida.

Perfumes
Pierre Balmain also created perfumes. His first scent – Elysees 64-83 (1946, perfumer Germaine Cellier). Vent Vert (1947, G.Cellier) – one of the best-selling perfumes of the late 1940s and early 1950s. Other scents included Jolie Madame (1953), Monsieur Balmain (1964), Miss Balmain (1967) – perfumes of Germaine Cellier, Ivoire (1979).

Publications
Balmain, Pierre, My Years and Seasons, Cassell, London 1964

References

External links
House of Balmain
Vintage designs and adverts by Pierre Balmain

 
 

1914 births
1982 deaths
People from Saint-Jean-de-Maurienne
French fashion designers
Drama Desk Award winners
LGBT fashion designers
French LGBT artists
20th-century French LGBT people